"World Peace Is None of Your Business" is a song by English singer Morrissey. It was released on 13 May 2014 as the first single from his tenth studio album of the same name (2014), through Harvest and Capitol Records. The single was accompanied by a music video, directed by Natalie Johns. The song was recorded in France with Morrissey's touring band which features guitarists Boz Boorer and Jesse Tobias, bassist Solomon Walker, drummer Matthew Walker and keyboardist Gustavo Manzur and was produced by Joe Chiccarelli, who is known for his production work for Beck and The Strokes.

Due to changes in global music consumption, the physical versions of the first four singles from this album were released together as one 10" vinyl.

The song was previously debuted live on 7 May 2014 at the San Jose Civic Auditorium in San Jose, California.

Artwork
The artwork and the release date of the single was revealed on 12 May 2014. It features "Morrissey dressed in a crisp white T-shirt and blue jeans and hanging out with a dog after writing some graffiti." The artwork has been described as "very Morrissey-esque" and was praised by Pitchfork Media staff writer Evan Minsker.

Music video
The accompanying music video, directed by Natalie Johns, was also released on 13 May 2014. It features Morrissey performing the spoken word rendition of the song over a "jazzy piano backing." Nancy Sinatra also makes a cameo appearance in the video. The spoken word rendition of the song was compared to Radiohead track "Fitter Happier" from OK Computer (1997) and the "Choose Life" monologue in the film, Trainspotting (1996).

Track listing
Digital download
 "World Peace Is None of Your Business" – 4:21

Personnel
 Morrissey – vocals

Additional musicians
 Boz Boorer – guitar 
 Jesse Tobias – guitar
 Solomon Walker – bass
 Matthew Walker – drums
 Gustavo Manzur – keyboards

Technical personnel
 Joe Chiccarelli – production

References

2014 songs
2014 singles
Morrissey songs
Harvest Records singles
Capitol Records singles
Songs written by Morrissey
Songs written by Boz Boorer